HD 32820, also known as HR 1651, is a yellowish-white hued star located in the southern constellation Caelum, the chisel. It has an apparent magnitude of 6.3, placing it near the limit of naked eye visibility.

HD 32820 has a stellar classification of F8 V, indicating that it is an ordinary F-type main-sequence star that is generating energy via hydrogen fusion at its core. It has 125% the mass of the Sun and 133% of its radius. HD 32820 is said to be 3.46 billion years old, slightly younger than the Sun , and has a near solar iron abundance.

References

F-type main-sequence stars
High-proper-motion stars
32820
23555
1651
CD-41 01690
Caeli, 27
Caelum